The 1980 Major League Baseball season concluded with the Philadelphia Phillies winning their first World Series championship.

A strike during April 1–8 caused the final eight days of spring training to be canceled, but did not impact the regular season schedule.

Umpire uniforms in both leagues were standardized, the American League's red blazer and blue pants and the National League's blue coats and pants were discarded and the uniforms became blue blazers, light blue short sleeved shirts, gray pants, and blue hats with "AL" or "NL" to show which league they were in.  The American League umpires adopted numbers on their uniforms for the first time; National League umpires had numbers on the uniforms since 1970, though the numbers were now white on the blazers and blue on the short-sleeved shirts.

The All-Star Game, held at Dodger Stadium, saw the National League defeat the American League, 4–2.

The Phillies finished their regular season with a 91–71 record, defeated the Houston Astros in the 1980 NLCS, and defeated the Kansas City Royals in the 1980 World Series.

Standings

American League

National League

  The Houston Astros defeated the Los Angeles Dodgers in a one-game playoff to earn the NL West division title.

Postseason

Bracket

Awards and honors
Baseball Hall of Fame
Al Kaline
Chuck Klein
Duke Snider
Tom Yawkey

Other awards
Outstanding Designated Hitter Award: Hal McRae (KC)
Roberto Clemente Award (Humanitarian): Phil Niekro (ATL)
Rolaids Relief Man Award: Dan Quisenberry (KC, American); Rollie Fingers (SD, National).

Player of the Month

Pitcher of the Month

Statistical leaders

Home Field Attendance

Events

January–April
January 9 – Al Kaline and Duke Snider are elected to the Hall of Fame by the Baseball Writers' Association of America. Kaline is the 10th player to be elected in his first year of eligibility, while Snider is making his 11th appearance on the ballot.
January 24 – The New York Mets are sold to a group headed by Nelson Doubleday, Jr. and Fred Wilpon for an estimated $21.1 million. It was, at the time, the highest amount ever paid for an American professional sports franchise.
February 12 – The Board of the Oakland Coliseum and the Oakland City Council both reject an attempt to buy out the remainder of the Oakland Athletics' lease to the stadium.  This blocks an attempt to sell the team and a possible move to Denver.
March 8 – Rookie Joe Charboneau of the Cleveland Indians is attacked outside a Mexico City hotel.  A fan seeking his autograph stabs him in the chest with a pen.  Charboneau misses the start of the year, but goes on to bat .289, hitting 23 home runs, while driving in 87 RBI in 131 games.  He will be elected American League Rookie of the Year.
March 12 – Slugger Chuck Klein and former Boston Red Sox owner Tom Yawkey are elected to the Hall of Fame by the Special Veterans Committee. Yawkey is the first club owner selected who never served as a player, manager or general manager.

May–August
May 23 – Texas Rangers pitcher Ferguson Jenkins wins his 250th game against the Oakland Athletics. Jenkins pitched a complete game for the Rangers, striking out eight batters in the victory.
June 27 – Jerry Reuss of the Los Angeles Dodgers no-hits the San Francisco Giants 8–0 at Candlestick Park.
July 4
Houston Astros pitcher Nolan Ryan strikes out César Gerónimo of the Cincinnati Reds, to become the fourth major league pitcher ever to reach 3,000 career strikeouts. Gerónimo was also Bob Gibson's 3,000th career strikeout victim six years earlier. Despite the milestone, Ryan allows six runs in 4.1 innings and Houston loses, 8–1.
During the first-ever fireworks night hosted at Shea Stadium, Montreal Expos Rookie Bill Gullickson sailed a pitch over New York Mets first baseman Mike Jorgensen's head in the second game of a doubleheader. Jorgensen did not appreciate this as he had been the victim of one of the worst beanball injuries in baseball history the previous season with the Texas Rangers, and motioned toward Gullickson his disapproval. Mets catcher John Stearns, who was not even in the line-up for this game, charged out of the dugout and welcomed Gullickson to the majors by slamming him to the ground.
July 6 – Philadelphia Phillies pitcher Steve Carlton becomes the major leagues' left-handed strikeout king, fanning seven Cardinals in an 8–3 Phillies win to bring his career total to 2,836. Mickey Lolich had held the record with 2,832.
July 8 – At Dodger Stadium, the National League battles back to win its ninth consecutive All-Star Game over the American League, 4–2. Ken Griffey goes 2-for-3 with a solo home run to win the MVP honors.
July 30 – Houston Astros pitcher J. R. Richard suffers a stroke during his first attempt to pitch since being hospitalized for tests weeks earlier.  He would not play again.

September–December
September 10 – Bill Gullickson strikes out 18, the most by a major league rookie pitcher, as the Montréal Expos beat the Chicago Cubs 4–2.
September 20
 George Brett goes 0-for-4 dropping his batting average below .400. It will not climb above .400 again, and he finishes the season with a .390 batting average, the closest any player had come to a .400 batting average since Ted Williams in 1941.  Only Tony Gwynn will come closer than that before the twentieth century ends.
The Minnesota Twins' game with the Chicago White Sox at Metropolitan Stadium was postponed due to rain.  The game was the last outdoor MLB game to be postponed in the state for almost three decades as the Twins moved to the Hubert H. Humphrey Metrodome in 1982 and ultimately to Target Field in 2010, where their scheduled game with the Baltimore Orioles on May 7 was rained out.
September 24 – The Atlanta Braves reach the 1,000,000 mark in attendance. It marks the first time that every National League team has drawn at least 1,000,000 fans for a season.
October 4
 In a 17–1 rout of the Minnesota Twins, Willie Wilson of the Kansas City Royals becomes the first major league player ever to be credited with 700 at-bats in a single season, and ends the year with 705 at bats. He also sets the AL record for singles in a season with 184, eclipsing the mark Sam Rice set in 1925. Wilson also becomes only the second player in major league history to collect 100 hits from each side of the plate, matching the feat accomplished by Garry Templeton in 1979.
 Philadelphia's Mike Schmidt hits a 2-run home run in the top of the 11th inning to give the Phillies a 6–4 win over the Montreal Expos at Olympic Stadium, clinching the National League East title. The home run is Schmidt's 48th of the season, breaking Eddie Mathews' single-season record for third basemen set in 1953.
October 5 and 6 – On October 3, the Los Angeles Dodgers had been down three games to the Houston Astros to tie for the National League West Division title.  Needing a sweep of the Astros, the Dodgers complete just such a sweep on that Sunday; each of the wins by a single run.  They would play a one-game playoff the next day, as Joe Niekro would win his twentieth game of the season to earn a win for the Astros, 7–1, clinching their first Division Title.
October 10 – In Game 3 of the 1980 ALCS, and with the New York Yankees leading 2–1, Kansas City Royals' George Brett delivered a three-run home run off Yankees' reliever Rich Gossage, and with it total revenge for the Royals, who won the pennant after being second best to the Yankees in the ALCS in 1976, 1977 and 1978. Kansas City won the pennant in Yankee Stadium.
 October 12 – The Philadelphia Phillies capture their first pennant since 1950 with a 10-inning, 8–7 win over the Houston Astros at the Astrodome, in the fifth and final game of the 1980 NLCS. Three of the last four games were decided in extra innings. The Phillies, down by three runs to Nolan Ryan in the 8th inning, rally and go ahead on Garry Maddox's double in the 10th inning.
 October 21 – The Philadelphia Phillies win the World Series, the first WS Championship in their 98-year history, by beating the Kansas City Royals, 4–1, in Game Six. Steve Carlton earns the win, though the most memorable moment may be Tug McGraw on the mound jumping for joy as he earns the save after loading the bases with no outs.  Another equally memorable moment comes with one out in the bottom of the ninth when Frank White's pop-up is bobbled by Bob Boone, only to be tipped into the glove of Pete Rose.  Philadelphia's Mike Schmidt is named MVP, hitting .381 with two home runs and seven RBI, while KC's Willie Wilson is the "goat", striking out a WS-record 12 times, including the final out of the Series with the bases loaded, and hitting only .154. Of the original 16 Major League franchises from 1901, the Phillies are the last to win their first World Series.
November 3 – An era ends for the Oakland Athletics as the sale of the team is finalized.  The flamboyant Charlie O. Finley sells the team to Walter A. Haas, ending his relationship with the team.
November 4 – Sadaharu Oh announces his retirement as a player from Japanese baseball. His 868 documented career home runs remain an unapproached world record among professional baseball players.
November 25 – Gene Michael becomes the 25th manager in New York Yankees history, replacing a resigning Dick Howser, who led the team to the American League East Division title with a 103–59 mark.
November 26 – Philadelphia Phillies third baseman Mike Schmidt, who hit .286 with career highs of 48 home runs and 121 RBI, is a unanimous choice as National League Most Valuable Player.
December 1 – Los Angeles Dodgers relief pitcher Steve Howe wins the National League Rookie of the Year Award, edging Montréal Expos starting pitcher Bill Gullickson and outfielder Lonnie Smith of the Philadelphia Phillies. Howe posted a 7–9 record with a 2.65 ERA and 17 saves.
December 9 – The Chicago Cubs send relief pitcher Bruce Sutter to their arch-rivals, the St. Louis Cardinals, in exchange for first baseman Leon Durham. Sutter will go on to save many more games for the Cardinals, including the 1982 World Series clincher, while Durham's critical error in Game 5 of the 1984 NLCS will doom the Cubs.

Deaths
 January 10 – Hughie Critz, 79, second baseman for the Cincinnati Reds and New York Giants who led NL in fielding four times and double plays three times
January 21 – Gene Rye, 73, outfielder for the 1931 Boston Red Sox
February 1 – Fred Walters, 67, catcher for the 1945 Boston Red Sox, and one of many players who only appeared in the majors during World War II
February 2 – Jack Rothrock, 74, center fielder for four different teams from 1925 to 1937, who led the victorious St. Louis Cardinals with six RBI in the 1934 World Series
 March 1 – Emmett Ashford, 65, the major leagues' first black umpire, who worked in the American League from 1966 to 1970 and in the 1970 World Series
March 1 – Johnny Watwood, 74, center fielder who played from 1929 to 1939 for the Chicago White Sox, Boston Red Sox and Philadelphia Phillies
 April 7 – Buck Canel, 74, Spanish-language broadcaster of 42 World Series, as well as many years of New York Yankees games
 April 21 – Ray Dobens, 73, pitcher for the 1929 Boston Red Sox
 April 21 – Joe Page, 62, All-Star relief pitcher for the New York Yankees who set single-season record with 27 saves in 1949, led AL in saves and appearances twice each
 April 28 – Bob Porterfield, 56, All-Star pitcher who was named The Sporting News AL Pitcher of the Year in 1953 after a 22–10 season with the Senators
 June 1 – Rube Marquard, 93, Hall of Fame pitcher who retired with 201 wins and the NL record for career strikeouts by a left-hander (1593); had 19 consecutive wins for the Giants in 1912 for a modern major league record
 June 3 – Fred Lieb, 92, sportswriter who covered every World Series from 1911 to 1958
June 9 – Odell Hale, 71, infielder for the Cleveland Indians in the 1930s, who hit .300 three times and collected two 100-RBI seasons
July 4 – Jack Martin, 93, shortstop who played from 1912 to 1914 for the New York Highlanders, Boston Braves and Philadelphia Phillies
July 23 – Wally Snell, 91, catcher for the 1913 Boston Red Sox, who later went on to a distinguished career as a college botany professor and athletic coach at Brown University for four decades
July 30 – Joe Lucey, 83, infielder/pitcher for the New York Yankees and Boston Red Sox between 1920 and 1925
August 4 – Lefty Jamerson, 80, pitcher for the 1924 Boston Red Sox
August 27 – John Wilson, 77, pitched briefly for the Red Sox from 1927 to 1928
 September 24 – Ernie Shore, 89, pitcher who relieved Babe Ruth with a man on first in a 1917 game and proceeded to retire the runner and all 26 remaining batters
 October 1 – Pat Veltman, 74, utility player best known for his 1928 season, where his only hit was a triple
November 29 – Bill Dunlap, 71, outfielder for the Boston Braves from 1929 to 1930
December 5 – Don Padgett, 69, backup catcher/outfielder who hit .288 in 699 games with the Cardinals, Dodgers, Braves and Phillies from 1937 to 1948
 December 14 – Elston Howard, 51, nine-time All-Star catcher for the New York Yankees who was that team's first black player and the AL's 1963 MVP; later a coach
 December 31 – Bob Shawkey, 90, pitcher who had four 20-win seasons for the Yankees, later was coach at Dartmouth

References

External links
1980 Major League Baseball season schedule at Baseball Reference

 
Major League Baseball seasons

ja:1980年の野球